Poesia (Italian: Poetry) is an Italian magazine founded by Filippo Tommaso Marinetti in Milan in 1905 which was closely associated with the Italian Futurist movement. During its early existence a total of thirty-one issues were published until the 1920s. It was headquartered in Verona.

Later Poesia was revived and is still published in Milan. The original magazine supported modern poetry from different nations. It still covers poems by different artists.

See also
List of magazines in Italy

References

External links

All issues of the magazine digitalized on Internet Archive by the Archivio del '900 of Mart Museum, Italy
 Blue Mountain Project - browse Poesia by title

1905 establishments in Italy
Italian Futurism
Italian-language magazines
Literary magazines published in Italy
Magazines established in 1905
Magazines published in Milan
Mass media in Verona
Poetry literary magazines
Avant-garde magazines